Federal Highway 179 (Carretera Federal 179) is a Federal Highway of Mexico. The highway travels from north of Xochiapan, Veracruz in Santiago Sochiapan municipality in the north to San Pablo de Villa Mitla, Oaxaca in the south. Much of the median of the highway remains unpaved.

References

179